Hitler: The Lost Tapes is a British documentary series about the rise and fall of Adolf Hitler and Nazi Germany through analysis of digitized rarely-seen photographs taken by Hitler's photographer Heinrich Hoffmann and from Eva Braun's personal photo collection including home videos shot by Braun mostly at Hitler's Berghof estate as told by historians including Guy Walters. The series premiered on 17 September 2022 and concluded on 1 October with a total of four episodes. The show was originally titled Hitler: A Life In Pictures and was bought by Channel 4 in February 2022.

Episodes

Reception
Anita Singh, the arts and entertainment editor of The Daily Telegraph criticized the series' use of "The Lost Tapes" in the title claiming, "The suspicion is that Channel 4 slaps these titles on its documentaries because it feels the need to make them sound splashy." But said the show had "interesting information, packaged in the wrong way." And that the show would have better focused on examining the relationship between Hitler and Hoffman in greater depth.

Pat Stacey of the Irish Independent wrote in his review giving the series a rating of two out of five, "When it comes to television, it’s always going to be springtime for Hitler anyway. Broadcasters know there’s a ready-made audience who just can’t get enough of the stumpy Austrian corporal, no matter how thin or dubious the material."

References

External links
 

2022 British television series debuts
2022 British television series endings
2020s British documentary television series
Channel 4 documentary series
Documentary television series about World War II
English-language television shows
Works about Adolf Hitler